In finance, a portfolio is a collection of investments.

Definition

The term “portfolio” refers to any combination of financial assets such as stocks, bonds and cash. Portfolios may be held by individual investors or managed by financial professionals, hedge funds, banks and other financial institutions. It is a generally accepted principle that a portfolio is designed according to the investor's risk tolerance, time frame and investment objectives. The monetary value of each asset may influence the risk/reward ratio of the portfolio.

When determining asset allocation, the aim is to maximise the expected return and minimise the risk. This is an example of a multi-objective optimization problem: many efficient solutions are available and the preferred solution must be selected by considering a tradeoff between risk and return. In particular, a portfolio A is dominated by another portfolio A' if A' has a greater expected gain and a lesser risk than A. If no portfolio dominates A, A is a Pareto-optimal portfolio.
The set of Pareto-optimal returns and risks is called the Pareto efficient frontier for the Markowitz portfolio selection problem. Recently, an alternative approach to portfolio diversification has been suggested in the literatures that combines risk and return in the optimization problem.

Description
There are many types of portfolios including the market portfolio and the zero-investment portfolio. A portfolio's asset allocation may be managed utilizing any of the following investment approaches and principles: dividend weighting, equal weighting, capitalization-weighting, price-weighting, risk parity, the capital asset pricing model, arbitrage pricing theory, the Jensen Index, the Treynor ratio, the Sharpe diagonal (or index) model, the value at risk model, modern portfolio theory and others.

There are several methods for calculating portfolio returns and performance. One traditional method is using quarterly or monthly money-weighted returns; however, the true time-weighted method is a method preferred by many investors in financial markets. There are also several models for measuring the performance attribution of a portfolio's returns when compared to an index or benchmark, partly viewed as investment strategy.

See also

 Capital asset pricing model
 Infection ratio
 Investment management

References

Financial markets
Investment
Personal finance